King Edward VII Gold Cup (for sponsorship reasons referred to as Argo Group Gold Cup) is an annual match racing sailing competition and event on the World Match Racing Tour. It is sailed in International One Design yachts.

Winners

References

Sailing competitions in Bermuda
World Match Racing Tour
Match racing competitions
Recurring sporting events established in 1937